Nimai Bali is an Indian actor who generally plays mythological supporting and villainous roles. He is also famous for his role in the TV series Laado 2.

Career
Bali began his career playing Surya in the TV series Chandrakanta. He went on to play role of Senior Inspector Pratap in the TV series CID: Special Bureau.

Bali is known for portraying Pawan Dev and Emperor Vali in the 1997-2000 Hindi television serial Jai Hanuman, directed by Sanjay Khan.

He played the role of Lord Vishnu's guard Jaya, and two of Jaya's three asura incarnations, Hiranyakashipu and Ravan.

He also played Duryodhana in Khan's miniseries Jai Mahabharat in 2001, and appeared in the serials Bhabhi, Kumkum - Ek Pyara Sa Bandhan, Doli Saja Ke, Amber Dhara, Woh Rehne Waali Mehlon Ki, Yug and Om Namah Shivay.

Bali played the role of Ravana in Jai Jai Jai Bajrang Bali.

Bali played the role of Inspector Malvade in the Bollywood movie Rahasya, released in January 2015.

He had also appeared in Suryaputra Karn as Drona and Maharaj Kans in Baal Krishna.

He portrayed the role of Ugrapat in the TV serial RadhaKrishn and Shankaracharya in the TV serial Devi Adi Parashakti.

Personal life
Bali is married to actress Sahila Chadha. The couple has a daughter, Princess. He is a cousin of Bollywood star Sanjay Dutt.

His hobbies include cars and martial arts.

Filmography

Television 

 Laado 2 as Indra Baba Choudhary (Main Male Antagonist) opposite Ananya Khare who plays Malhari Indra Baba Choudhary
Phir Subah Hogi (2012) as Hukum
 Chupaun Kaise Laga Chunri Mein Daag, 2012
 Chandrakanta as Surya
 Yug as Hajaari
 Betaal Pachisi as Teja
 Jai Hanuman as Vayu Dev/Bali/Makardhwaj/Duryodhan
 Gul Sanobar as Jhigala, 1999–2000
 Wanted as Inspector Abhimanyu
 Raavan as Vanara Bali
 Om Namah Shivay as Jalandhar /Sindurasur/ Duryodhan
 Rishton Se Badi Pratha
 C.I.D. as Senior Inspector Pratap
  Bhabhi as Radheshyam
 Doli Saja Ke as Dhananjay Singhania 
 Woh Rehne Waali Mehlon Ki as Abhay Parashar
 Jai Jai Jai Bajrang Bali as Ravana
 Maharathi Karna as Duryodhan
 Mahabharat Katha as Anushalva
 Vishnu Puran  as Hiranyakashipu / Ravan/Jay
  Maa Shakti as Mahishasur Bani - Ishq Da Kalma as Balbir Singh Bhullar
 Saath Saath Banayenge Ek Aashiyaan as Ranveer Singh
  Dehleez as Raghuveer
 Jai Mahabharat as Duryodhan
 Balika Vadhu as L.P. Shrivastav
 Suryaputra Karn as Guru Drona
 Shree Ganesh as Tarakasura and Mohasura
 Om Namo Narayan as Adharm (Injustice)
 Baal Krishna as Kans
 Mahakali — Anth Hi Aarambh Hai as Guru Shukracharya
 Porus as Amatya Rakshas
 Chandragupta Maurya as Amatya Rakshas
 Radha Krishn as Ugrapat
 Devi Adi Parashakti as Shukracharya
 Jap Tap Vrat as Shanidev
 Karmaphal Daata Shani as Sage Vishwamitra
 Ghar Sansaar as Mr. DablaBrij Ke Gopal'' as Sahukaar

References

External links
 

Indian male television actors
Living people
Indian male film actors
1969 births